Hello World is the sixth studio album by Japanese pop rock band, Scandal. The album was released on December 3, 2014 in Japan by Epic and being distributed in Europe through JPU Records. Hello World debuted at #3 on the Oricon chart, selling over 35,000 copies in its first week. It also reached the top spot of the Canadian iTunes Store's World Music Chart.

Track listing

Charts

Personnel
Scandal
 Haruna Ono — vocal, guitar (1–11, 13–15), güiró (15), lyrics (5, 8), music (5)
 Mami Sasazaki — vocal, guitar (1–11, 13), synth, recorder (15), lyrics (1, 3, 4, 9), music (1, 3, 4, 9, 11), arrangements (7, 9)
 Tomomi Ogawa — vocal, bass (1–15), lyrics (6, 10, 15), tambourine (15), music (10, 15)
 Rina Suzuki — vocal, drums (1–15), guitar (12), cajón (15), lyrics (7, 11, 12, 14), music (11, 12)

Contributing musicians
 Tetsuya Komuro — synth (13)
 Eisuke Taga — slide whistle (15)

Post-production
 Executive producer: Shunsuke Muramatsu, Satoshi Aoki (Epic Records Japan), Yūichi Orimoto (Kitty Entertainment Ltd.)
 Mastered by: Yūji Chinone (Sony Music Studios Tokyo)
 Arrangements: Keita Kawaguchi (1, 2, 10, 12, 13), Seiji Kameda (4, 6), Atsushi (5), Yū Odakura (8), Satori Shiraishi (11)
 Additional arrangements: Keita Kawaguchi (3, 7, 9)
 Mix engineer: Keita Yoko (1–3, 5, 7, 9–12), Eiji "Q" Makino (4, 6), Uni Inoue (8), Jan Fairchild (13)
 Instrumental technician: Bunta Mochizuki, Kōta Oda (Sound Crew)

Packaging
 Art direction: Yūji Takao (Kannana Graphic)
 Coordinarion: Kōichi Yamatani (Kannana Graphic)
 Design: Sayuri Kamata (Kannana Graphic)
 Photography: Hirohisa Nakano
 Styling: Kyōhei Ogawa
 Hair & make-up: Hirokazu Niwa, Kazuhiro Sugimoto (maroonbrand)
 Set design: Chihiro Matsumoto (Art Breakers)

Epic Records Japan Staff
 A&R director: Akito Ogawa
 A&R promotion: Yuriko Konya
 A&R producer: Sen Okada, Ikuko Yamaguchi
 A&R assistant: Shingo Shinkawa
 Media promotion: Mayuko Isebō, Akihito Muraki, Rie Ikeda, Masaki Inoue, Akiko Itō, Akira Morikawa
 Area promotion: Akiko Satō, Nozomi Takahama, Yūichirō Hisaizumi, Takako Yamamoto, Shōta Aoyama, Junichirō Kumahara
 Planning Supervisor: Ikuo Hayashi
 Label Administration: Kumiko Sugita, Miki Takashima, Satomi Mizusawa, Haruna Takizawa

Kitty Entertainment Ltd. Staff
 Sound director: Taichi Ōhira
 Manager: Taga Eisuke, Arisa Yamamoto
 Concert creative: Fumihiko Tsuchiya, Mikako Ogura
 Artist promotion: Ayano Takahashi, Kyōko Shioji
 Merchandise: Hiroshi Aihara, Erina Fujii, Hibari Sakai
 Special adviser: Hidenori Taga, Yoshihisa Nagata

Sony Music Group Staff
 Sales promotion: Hiromi Kanehira, Dai Sugamata, Chie Arai, Minami Kodama (Sony Music Marketing)
 Web promotion: Takuya Ishikawa, Sayaka Tsuji (Sony Music Marketing)
 International promotion: Ken Isayama, Akira Shiota (Sony Music Entertainment)
 Music publishing: Ei Ōsaka, Niina Yasui (Sony Music Publishing)
 Business affairs: Hitomi Takano, Momoko Hakata (Sony Music Entertainment)
 Products co-ordination: Chiho Sugiyama (Sony Music Communications)

JPU Records Staff
 Sales and Physical Distribution: Ben Farrar, Tim Chilton
 Marketing and promotion: Tom Smith
 Coordination: Tom Smith

References

External links
 Hello World Listing at JPU Records 

2014 albums
Japanese-language albums
Scandal (Japanese band) albums
Epic Records albums